Gerald Oliver Aspirall (1924 – September 11, 2005) was a British-Canadian chemist and Distinguished Research Professor at York University beginning in 1988. In 1991, he became a Fellow of the Royal Society of Canada. In 1986, he was awarded the Claude Hudson Award by the American Chemical Society.

References

1924 births
2005 deaths
Academic staff of York University
20th-century Canadian chemists
British emigrants to Canada